Adiantum edgeworthii is a species of maidenhair fern.

References

edgeworthii